This page provides supplementary data and solvent coefficients for linear free-energy relationships.

Partition between water and organic solvents
The LFER used to obtain partition coefficients that uses the systems below takes the form log Ps = c + eE + sS + aA + bB + vV

Partition between gas phase and organic solvents
The LFER used to obtain partition coefficients that uses the systems below takes the form log Ks = c + eE + sS + aA + bB + lL

References

Physical organic chemistry
Chemical data pages cleanup
Chemical data pages